The MG GT is a compact car produced by SAIC Motor under the MG marque.

First generation (2014) 

In July 2014, MG extended its offer with a compact sedan called GT, which was developed on the basis of the MG 5 hatchback as its three-box version with a separate body styling. The car has avant-garde body styling, with aggressively shaped headlights, as well as a gently sloping roofline towards the rear, crowned by a one-piece strip of lights extending the entire width of the body. In the passenger compartment, MG applied a more subdued design than in the case of the body, led by a massive central console dominated by a centrally located multimedia system display. It is equipped with an infotainment system, as well as connectivity with 3G, the internet and satellite TV, in addition to screen control, enabling operation via a button panel.

Initially, the GT was offered only with a 154 hp 1.4 L four-cylinder petrol engine, while in 2015, the offer was also expanded by two larger 1.5-liter units with 109 hp and a more powerful, turbocharged engine, developing 129 hp.

Markets 
The GT was built for the Chinese market in mind, where its sale began in November 2014. In addition, sales and production from Thailand  began in 2015 under the name MG 5, while in 2016, the vehicle was exported to Chile.

The production of GT lasted for 5 years, ending in the first half of 2019. The following year, MG introduced the new compact sedan in the form of the second generation 5.

Second generation (2021) 

The second-generation MG GT is a rebadged second-generation MG 5 for the Middle Eastern market.

References

External links

 MG GT Middle East

2010s cars
GT
Cars introduced in 2014
Sedans